B. Keith Westmoreland (August 26, 1946 – June 19, 2002) was an American businessman and Republican politician from Tennessee.

Education

Born in Kingsport, Tennessee, Westmoreland served in the United States Air Force. He went to University of Tennessee and Walters State Community College and then received his bachelor's degree in criminal justice from East Tennessee State University.

Career

Westmoreland worked in the Sullivan County, Tennessee sheriff department and then as served as Sullivan County, Tennessee County Executive from 1986 to 1990. He then served in the Tennessee House of Representatives as a Republican from 1993 to 2002.

Westmoreland shot himself at his home in Kingsport, Tennessee six days after being charged with seven counts of indecent exposure to a minor.

Notes

1946 births
2002 deaths
People from Kingsport, Tennessee
Military personnel from Tennessee
University of Tennessee alumni
East Tennessee State University alumni
Heads of county government in Tennessee
Republican Party members of the Tennessee House of Representatives
American politicians who committed suicide
Suicides by firearm in Tennessee
Tennessee politicians convicted of crimes
20th-century American politicians
Walters State Community College alumni
2002 suicides